Juan Alonso y Ocón (21 March 1597 – 12 October 1656) was a Roman Catholic prelate who served as Archbishop of La Plata o Charcas (1651–1656), Bishop of Cuzco (1642–1651), and Bishop of Yucatán (1638–1642).

Biography
Juan Alonso y Ocón was born in Villa de Ocón, Spain. On 14 June 1638 he was selected by the King of Spain and confirmed by Pope Urban VIII as Bishop of Yucatán. He was consecrated bishop by Diego Castejón Fonseca, Bishop Emeritus of Lugo with Miguel Avellán, Auxiliary Bishop of Toledo, and Timoteo Pérez Vargas, Bishop of Ispahan, serving as co-consecrators. On 3 November 1642 he was selected by the King of Spain and confirmed on 31 August 1643 by Pope Urban VIII as Bishop of Cuzco. On 2 April 1651 he was selected by the King of Spain and confirmed by Pope Innocent X as Bishop of La Plata o Charcas where he served until his death on 12 October 1656.

Episcopal succession
While bishop, he was the principal consecrator of:
Mauro Diego de Tovar y Valle Maldonado, Bishop of Caracas, Santiago de Venezuela (1639); 
and the principal co-consecrator of:

References

External links and additional sources
 (for Chronology of Bishops) 
 (for Chronology of Bishops) 
 (for Chronology of Bishops) 
 (for Chronology of Bishops) 
 (for Chronology of Bishops) 
 (for Chronology of Bishops) 

1597 births
1656 deaths
17th-century Roman Catholic archbishops in New Spain
17th-century Roman Catholic bishops in Peru
Bishops appointed by Pope Urban VIII
Bishops appointed by Pope Innocent X
17th-century Roman Catholic bishops in Mexico
Roman Catholic bishops of Cusco
Roman Catholic archbishops of Sucre